Spookley the Square Pumpkin is a 2004 Canadian computer-animated film about a geometric Canadian pumpkin based on the book The Legend of Spookley the Square Pumpkin by Joe Troiano. It was made by Holiday Hill Farm and released by Kidtoon Films and Lionsgate. The Honeydoos, three singing honeydews who sing in the style of The Pointer Sisters, are also featured. Bobby Pickett makes a brief cameo near the end of the film; his hit song "Monster Mash" is mentioned in one of the musical numbers "Transylvania Twist". Troiano and Zahn had previously written new music for Pickett's 1995 film adaptation of Monster Mash.

Spookley's Favorite Halloween Songs was released in 2012. Several Spookley the Square Pumpkin activity books were also released. A sequel, Spookley and the Christmas Kittens, was released in December 6, 2019, on Disney Junior. A 12-minute short The Spookley Easter Show released on Disney Junior on April 8, 2022.

Plot 
Two bats who can live at Holiday Hill Farm, bug-eating Boris and bug-loving vegetarian Bella, must discover an unusual sight in the pumpkin patch and rush to inform the farm's scarecrow, Jack, of their find, which is a young, innocent pumpkin named Spookley, who is unusually square-shaped instead of round. Jack took a liking to Spookley, but Little Tom, a small pumpkin attached by a vine to the much larger Big Tom, immediately began bullying and body shaming Spookley and said that only round pumpkins are real pumpkins. Jack quickly putted a stop to Little Tom's teasing. 

Jack organized the pumpkins in the patch to compete in the 'Jack-o-Lympics' contest, an athletic competition designed to determine the "Pick of the Patch." Three spiders, who may show superficial sympathy for Spookley, shall decide to help him in the Jack-o-Lympics just so they can help themselves to the prize, a crown made of candy corn. Throughout the competition, Big Tom and Little Tom are repeatedly disqualified for using their vine to give them an unfair advantage, leaving third-place finisher Bobo, a vain female pumpkin, to win most of the events. Spookley turned out to be a total failure at all the events, leaving him discouraged. 

As Bobo is crowned the winner and the spiders will abandon Spookley to help themselves to her crown, a severe wind storm hit the pumpkin patch, pushing the pumpkins all over and pinning Jack under a flaming tree branch. Spookley, because he is square, does not roll away when the wind hit him, although unlike the other pumpkins, and, through some moments of ingenuity, rescued Jack from being burned alive and his fellow pumpkins from being washed away in the river. The other pumpkins will express gratitude to Spookley for saving them, and he is hailed a hero. 

After the storm, the farmer went into the patch to assess the storm damage and discovered Spookley. The farmer is charmed by Spookley's unique shape and decides to make the square pumpkin his own personal jack-o'-lantern.

Cast
 Sonja Ball as Spookley the Square Pumpkin / Other Honeydoos
 Vlasta Vrána as Narrator
 Craig Francis as Jack the Scarecrow
 Rick Jones as Little Tom / Edgar
 Michel Perron as Big Tom
 Holly Gauthier-Frankel as Bella / Other Honeydoos
 Norman Groulx as Boris
 Terrence Scammell as Allan
 Bruce Dinsmore as Poe
 Jennifer Seguin as Bobo
 Kim Richardson as Lead Honeydoo
 Jayson Alonzo as various pumpkins

Production
TBA

Music
The Spookley the Square Pumpkin soundtrack was composed by Joe Troiano and Jeffrey Zahn and released in October 2004. The album was produced by Jeffrey Zahn and Mark Zander. It includes "The Boo Song", recorded by Rick Jones, Terrence Scammell, and Bruce Dinsmore with lyrics by Zahn.

Reception
TBA

References

External links
 
 

2004 direct-to-video films
Canadian direct-to-video films
English-language Canadian films
2004 computer-animated films
Canadian children's animated films
Direct-to-video animated films
American films about Halloween
Films about bullying
2000s children's animated films
2004 films
2000s English-language films
2000s Canadian films